The Good Fight is a 2017 American legal drama television series.

The Good Fight or Good Fight may also refer to:

Film and television
The Good Fight, the 1983 documentary film about the Spanish Civil War
The Good Fight, a 1992 TV film directed by John David Coles
"The Good Fight", a 2002 TV episode of Sex and the City
"Ka Hakaka Maikaʻi", a 2011 episode of Hawaii Five-0

Literature
The Good Fight, a 1946 autobiography by Manuel L. Quezon
The Good Fight, a 1973 poetry collection by Thomas Kinsella
The Good Fight, a 1975 memoir by Louis Waldman
The Good Fight, a 2006 book by Peter Beinart

Music

Albums
The Good Fight (Bizzle album), 2013 
The Good Fight (Oddisee album), 2015
The Good Fight, a 2015 album by Cory Morrow
The Good Fight, a 2014 EP by The Exchange
The Good Fight, a 2007 album by Johnny Panic

Songs
"The Good Fight", a song by Jimmy Buffett from the 1981 album  Coconut Telegraph
"The Good Fight", a song by Dashboard Confessional from the 2001 album The Places You Have Come to Fear the Most
"The Good Fight", a song by Brant Bjork from the 2004 album Local Angel
"The Good Fight", a song by Phonte from the 2011 album Charity Starts at Home

Other uses
 Good Fight Entertainment, a business conglomerate

See also

A Good Fight, an American rock band
"Fight the Good Fight", a Christian hymn
New Testament military metaphors